Plaxis (sometimes stylised PLAXIS, Plane strain and axial symmetry, indicating the geometric types handled in the original code) is a computer program that performs finite element analyses (FEA) within the realm of geotechnical engineering, including deformation, stability and water flow. The input procedures enable the enhanced output facilities provide a detailed presentation of computational results. PLAXIS enables new users to work with the package after only a few hours of training.

Plaxis BV was acquired by the American Bentley Systems, Inc. in 2018.

References

Further reading

External links

Computer-aided design software for Windows
1982 software
Finite element software
Geotechnical engineering software